Akadi is a village in Kamrup district of Assam, situated on the north bank of the Brahmaputra RiverThe major nearby towns are Kamalpur and Baihata.

Transportation
Akadi is connected to nearby towns through National highway 27.

See also
 Aggumi

References

Villages in Kamrup district